Badulia is a village in Khandaghosh CD Block in Bardhaman Sadar South subdivisionof the Purba Bardhaman district in the state of West Bengal in India.

Geography 
Badulia is at an average elevation of 35 meters. It lies to the south of the Damodar River, on the alluvial plains between the Damodar and the Dwarakeswar River rivers. As a result, it has been a flood-prone area.

Badulia is 18 km from Khandaghosh and 12 km from Bardhaman. Most of the village falls on the west side of the Burdwan—Arambag Road. The Ghanaram Chakraborty Sarani, originating perpendicularly from the Burdwan—Arambag, road bisects the village.

Administration 
The village Badulia is in the Sagrai Gram Pachayet. The panchayat office is located in the central area of the village. The Block Development Office is 1 km from the Badulia bus stop.

Demographics
As per the 2011 Census of India Badulia had a total population of 3,905, of which 2,011 (51%) were males and 1,894 (49%) were females. Population below 6 years was 408. The total number of literates in Badulia was 2,778 (79.44% of the population over 6 years).

Economy 
Similar to any other village of south-east Burdwan, this is also agriculture based. After land reform in west Bengal the agricultural lands were distributed here also from the big land lords. Though there are few family where large area of lands are still accumulated but there are many family who have small amount of agricultural lands. In the last two decades because of the open market economy all over India has increased the cost of farming largely. Now agriculture is no more profitable occupation for the small farmers. A large number of people in this village are engaged now in construction industry. Few middle-class or upper-middle-class family members are engaged in rice related business. There are peoples engaged in self owned business and in government service in different sectors.

Health 
After long years of independence there is no public health system in this village. as this village is well connected with the district headquarters and its district hospital and private hospital people has not suffered too much. Apart from that though there is scarcity of expert medical practitioner in this village there are a few numbers of private pharmacy and elementary practitioners who serves in minor cases.

Politics 
In more recent years, as of 2017, there has been a dramatic change in the election scenario of this area. TMC won the Bishnupur Lok Sabha seat in 2014. It won the Khandaghosh Vidhan Sabha seat in 2016. In the Khandaghosh Panchayat Samiti election in 2013, TMC won 17 seats against 8 of CPI(M), 3 independents and 1 RSP.

For an overview of the economy etc. see Khandaghosh (community development block) and Bardhaman Sadar South subdivision

The major political party in this village was Communist Party of India (Marxist). The other political parties were All India Trinamool Congress (AITC), Bharatiya Janata Party (BJP) and Communist Party of Bharat (CPB). In this area all the portfolio from gram panchayet to Member of Parliament were from CPI(M). After the huge defeat in assembly election 2011 CPI(M) were quite silent, even they have kept closed their local branch office. Recently CPB has started to work here by theoretical battle with the bourgeois parties.

Though TMC had not won a single election from here till 2011, all red flags had been removed from this village. A fight for scientific socialism had started here but is yet to gain right momentum. After the national policy of open market, agrarian production cost increased but farmers were not getting that much profit from traditional agriculture. Middle-class families moved from agriculture blaming for the low profit to the high rate of wage cost. This wage rate for the labors were the result of large number of labor movement. CPI(M) forgot that land reform can not keep them for ever. All the benefits of land reform have vanished now. A major agrarian reform is much needed thing now which has to be performed with all along the state as well as country. CPB is advocating for the agrarian revolution without which rightist organization will attract peoples attraction only to the contractual wrongdoings and peoples cause will remain hindered.

References

Villages in Purba Bardhaman district